The Banalata Express  is a Bangladeshi Intercity train (Train no. 791/792) which runs between Chapainawabganj and Dhaka under Bangladesh Railway.

History
A new passenger train with modern facilities had started serving people to connect the Bangladeshi capital Dhaka with its northern city of Rajshahi on 25 April 2019. After few days this train route extended up to Chapainawabganj. Now its running Chapainawabganj-Rajashahi to Dhaka.

The train has modern facilities like bio-toilet, recliner chair, Wi-Fi connections, LED display, and save at least one and a half hour journey time than those of the existing three express trains plying between Dhaka and Rajshahi.

The train starts from Chapainawabganj at 6:00 am and arrives Kamalapur Railway Station in Dhaka at 11:30 am. Then it leaves Dhaka at 1:30 pm and reaches Chapainawabganj at 7:30 pm.

Naming 
Prime Minister Sheikh Hasina on Thursday inaugurated the train ‘Bonolota Express’ named after a famous Bangla poem Bonolota Sen by renowned poet Jibanananda Das.

Route
Banalata Express is a non-stop train from Chapainawabganj to Dhaka. It stops at four stations. Those are:
 Kamalapur Railway Station
 Airport railway station, Dhaka
 Rajshahi Railway Station
Chapainawabganj Station

Train schedule

Coach composition
The 928-seat ultra-modern and high-speed train with 12 coaches including two air-conditioned chairs and seven non-air conditioned chairs are running on the route without any stoppage between Dhaka and Rajshahi. It has two engines, imported from India in 2013, and twelve coaches, imported from Indonesia in the late 2010s. It was taken to Rajshahi from Ishwardi junction on April 23, 2019. Bangladesh Railways procured 50 high-speed and modern coaches from Indonesia for new trains on different routes, including the Rajshahi–Dhaka route.

See also
 Maitree Express
 Samjhauta Express
 Lalmoni Express

References

Named passenger trains of Bangladesh
Transport in Dhaka